Abdul Latif Nazari who is currently serving as Deputy Minister of Economy of the Islamic Emirate of Afghanistan since 26 December 2021.

He belongs to the Hazaras ethnicity. He holds a Ph.D. in political science from University of Tehran. He is founder of Gharjistan University.

References

Year of birth missing (living people)
Living people
Hazara people
Taliban government ministers of Afghanistan
University of Tehran alumni